Prosenjit Das (born December 17, 1996 in Brahmanbaria, Bangladesh) is a Bangladeshi first-class cricketer who played for Dhaka Division cricket team as well as Kala Bagan Cricket Academy. He is a right-handed wicket-keeper batsman.

References

External links
 

1996 births
Living people
Bangladeshi cricketers
Dhaka Division cricketers
Kala Bagan Cricket Academy cricketers
People from Brahmanbaria district
Bangladeshi Hindus
Wicket-keepers